The  or SAM-4 or  is a Japanese developed surface-to-air missile system currently in service with the JGSDF. The SAM's vehicle chassis is based on the Kato Works Ltd/Mitsubishi Heavy Industries NK series heavy crane truck. It uses a state-of-the-art active electronically scanned array radar.

Overview
The Chu-SAM air defense system is based on 8×8 cross country unarmored trucks, and includes a command center, radar unit, launcher, and transloader, with each unit equipped with six missiles that travel at Mach 2.5. The system can track up to 100 targets simultaneously and target 12 at the same time, engaging fighter jets, helicopters, and cruise missiles.

Upgrade 
In 2014, the JGSDF began evaluation of the upgraded Chu-SAM Kai, which uses improved sensor and networking features for better range and targeting of more complex cruise and anti-surface missile threats.  During the summer of 2015, 10 Chu-SAM Kai missiles were test fired at White Sands Missile Range in the United States and successfully intercepted various targets, including the GQM-163 Coyote supersonic target drone; White Sands hosted the launches because the location's large size and controlled airspace allowed for testing conditions unavailable in Japan. Operational tests of the Chu-SAM Kai took place at White Sands, in 2016.

The Chu-SAM Kai missile also planned to be converted to the long-range ship-to-air missile with a separable rocket booster.

Deployment
 since 2003
 at Camp Matsudo in Matsudo, Chiba since 2007
 in Ono, Hyōgo since 2008

Gallery

See  also
 List of missiles
 Anti-ballistic missile
Comparable SAMs:
MIM-104 Patriot
 Akash (missile)
 S-300
 DK-10
 HQ-16
 NASAMS
 KM-SAM
 Sky Bow

Notes

External links

JGSDF official(Japanese) 陸上自衛隊
03式中距離地対空誘導弾
TRDI Department of Guided Weapon Systems Development
Chu-SAM in Janes Land　Based Air Defence
Chu-SAM in global security.org

Mitsubishi Electric products, services and standards
Surface-to-air missiles of Japan
21st-century surface-to-air missiles
Military equipment introduced in the 2000s